Ondu Muttina Kathe is a 1987 Indian Kannada language film directed by Shankar Nag, starring Rajkumar and Archana. It is based on John Steinbeck's 1947 novella The Pearl. This was the last directorial of Shankar Nag. It is also the only movie in which he directed Rajkumar, making him the youngest person to direct him.

The movie was not very successful but is still remembered for its screenplay and technical superiority. It is considered one of the cult classic movies in the history of Kannada cinema. The film is also notable for the underwater fighting sequence by Rajkumar at the age of 58  with a London-made artificial octopus shot in the Maldives ocean with a Canadian camera by a German cameraman. It was the first Indian film to have an underwater action sequence shot in an ocean  outside India  without the help of oxygen mask.

Premise

The movie narrates the tale of Aithu, a pearl diver, who has to face many problems when he decides to sell a precious pearl which he finds in the ocean.

Cast
 Rajkumar as Aithu
 Archana as Kaaki
 Shivaram as Abutajja
 Mukhyamantri Chandru as Mahabala
 Doddanna as Doctor
 T. N. Balakrishna as Narasimha Swami
 Ramesh Bhat as Kutta
 L S Sudhindra
 Ashok Badaradinni as Doctor's Assistant
 Thoogudeepa Srinivas as Bollanna
 Sundar Raj as Dhooma
 Kaminidharan

Reception
Shankar had confessed in an interview that he had failed to break Rajkumar's image but was satisfied that an effort was made to tamper with the star system and appreciated Rajkumar for being co-operative in this cause by appearing in a role which was not typical. Riding on high expectations, Ondu Muttina Kathe received mixed response upon release. However, it ended up doubling its investment. It had the lowest share for a Dr Raj movie in the 1980s. The movie just ran for 7 weeks (less than 50 days) in the main theatre which again was the lowest for a Dr Rajkumar movie in the 1980s putting the then lowest Nee Nanna Gellalare (63 day) to the second position.,  Ondu Muttina Kathe has achieved cult status which in turn is evident from it being frequently shown on Udaya TV. It is considered one of the most technically advanced films of the 1980s era of Indian cinema.

Soundtrack

L. Vaidyanathan composed the background score for the film and the soundtracks. Lyrics for the soundtracks were penned by Chi. Udaya Shankar. The album consists of five soundtracks.

References

External links
 

1980s Kannada-language films
1987 films
Films based on works by John Steinbeck
Films directed by Shankar Nag
Films scored by L. Vaidyanathan
Films about cephalopods